Pine Street Elementary School is a public elementary school located at 500 South Pine Street in Spartanburg, South Carolina.  It serves children from kindergarten through fifth grade and is part of Spartanburg County School District No. 7.  Its school building, constructed in 1928–29, is a prominent local example of Beaux Arts architecture, and was listed on the National Register of Historic Places in 2016.  It is the oldest continuously operating school in Spartanburg County.

Fine Arts
Pine Street Elementary is accredited with one of the best fine arts programs in the state of South Carolina. Its fine arts staff includes Susan Woodham, Dance; Lori Patterson, Music; Jessica King, Music; Sarah Kate Scott, Visual Art; and Matt Smith and Mary Nicholson, Drama.

Odyssey
Pine Street Elementary is part of District 7's odyssey program for the gifted and talented.

Awards
 Recipient of the South Carolina Palmetto Gold Award annually since 2002
 Distinction in Arts Education Award for 2012/2013    South Carolina Association for Arts Education.

See also
National Register of Historic Places listings in Spartanburg County, South Carolina

References

External links 
 Pine Street Elementary School
 Spartanburg County School District No. 7

Public elementary schools in South Carolina
Schools in Spartanburg County, South Carolina
School buildings on the National Register of Historic Places in South Carolina
National Register of Historic Places in Spartanburg, South Carolina